Slatinky is a municipality and village in Prostějov District in the Olomouc Region of the Czech Republic. It has about 600 inhabitants.

Geography
It lies on the border between the Upper Morava Valley and Zábřeh Highlands.

There is a part of Kosířské lomy National Nature Monument in the southern part of the municipal territory.

History
The first written mention of Slatinky is from 1247.

References

Villages in Prostějov District